Moolai ( Moolaai) is a town in Northern Jaffna District, Sri Lanka. It is located 12 km (7 mi) North West from the city of Jaffna.

Moolai Temples (மூளாய் கோவில்கள்) 

Vathiranpulo Siththivinayagar temple (வதிரன்புலோ சித்திவிநாயகர் தேவஸ்தானம்)
Vathiranpulo Mutthukumaraswamy temple (வதிரன்புலோ முத்துக்குமாரசுவாமி தேவஸ்தானம்)
Potpulampathy Maha Kaliambaal temple and Vairavar temple (பொற்புலம்பதி மஹா காளியம்பாள் கோவிலும் வைரவர் கோவிலும்)
Harihara Puththi Ayanaar temple (ஹரிஹர புத்தி ஐயனார் தேவஸ்தானம்)

Moolai Schools (மூளாய் பாடசாலைகள்)

See also
 Village website http://moolai.org
Moolai Cooperative Hospital

References 

Towns in Jaffna District
Valikamam West DS Division